Mohiuddin Ahmed (died 2010) was a Bangladeshi Army officer who was convicted and executed for the assassination of Sheikh Mujibur Rahman.

Mohiuddin Ahmed may also refer to:

 Mohiuddin Ahmad, Bangladeshi film director
 Mohiuddin Ahmad (author), Bangladeshi author
 Mohiuddin Ahmed (politician), Bangladeshi MP
 Mohiuddin Ahmed (publisher), Bangladeshi publisher and University Press Limited founder
 Mohiuddin Ahmed (Munshiganj politician), Bangladeshi MP
 A.K.M. Mohiuddin Ahmed (died 2010), Bangladesh Army officer convicted and executed for the assassination of Sheikh Mujibur Rahman

See also 
 Ahmed Mohiuddin (1923–1998), Pakistani scientist, scholar
 Ahmed Mohiuddin (politician) (1898–19xx), Indian politician